Nightmare (also known as Nightmares in a Damaged Brain) is a 1981 American slasher film written and directed by Romano Scavolini, and starring Baird Stafford and Sharon Smith. Its plot follows a deranged man, subject to a medical experiment, who leaves his New York City psychiatric institute to murder his ex-wife and child in Florida.

Nightmare gained instant notoriety among horror fans when it was banned in the UK as a video nasty and its distributor was sentenced to 18 months in prison for refusing to edit one second of violent footage. The film also garnered controversy for claiming in its press material that Tom Savini had provided the film's special effects, which Savini vehemently denied.

Plot
George Tatum has been incarcerated in a psychiatric institution in New York City for many years after sexually mutilating and murdering a family in Brooklyn. During his incarceration, George undergoes an experimental procedure that "reprograms" his brain, reforming him into an upstanding citizen. However, he remains plagued by hazy nightmares of a violent incident from his childhood. Upon his release, George visits a peep show in Times Square, which triggers flashbacks to his mother's murder.

The following day, George obtains a car and leaves New York, heading south to the Florida home of his ex-wife, Susan Temper, their daughters Kim and Tammy, and their mischievous young son, C.J., who frequently plays twisted pranks that disturb both her and babysitter Kathy. His car breaks down en route in Myrtle Beach, South Carolina, leaving him stranded overnight. There, he follows a woman home from a local bar, and brutally slashes her to death. Back in New York, George's psychiatrists discover he has fled the city, and begin tracking his movements.

Meanwhile in Florida, Susan is carrying on a relationship with her boyfriend, Bob Rosen, and struggles with her responsibilities as a single mother. Her house begins receiving numerous disturbing phone calls, which no one realizes are in fact being made by George. One night while Susan is out, Kathy receives multiple calls, which unnerve her. C.J. begins claiming he is being followed by a strange manhis father George, unbeknownst to himbut Susan dismisses it as another of his pranks. Later, George murders a classmate of C.J. and a teenage girl in an abandoned house during a game of hide-and-seek.

The following day, Kathy agrees to babysit the children while Susan attends a party. During the night, George infiltrates the house and murders Kathy and her boyfriend with a rock pick. After donning one of C.J.'s Halloween masks, an old man, George pursues the children, who have barricaded themselves in the upstairs bedrooms. C.J. obtains a revolver from his mother's dresser and uses it to shoot George a total of 8 times, eventually killing him.

As he lies dying, George has a full recall of his childhood, including a memory of catching his father engaging in sadomasochistic sex acts with another woman, during which he brutally murdered them both with a felling axe. Susan returns home to find police at her house removing George's body, whom Susan hysterically identifies as her husband. C.J., sitting in a police car, winks into the camera knowingly.

Cast
 Baird Stafford as George Tatum
 Sharon Smith as Susan Temper
 C.J. Cooke as C.J. Temper
 Mik Cribben as Bob Rosen
 Danny Ronan as Kathy
 Tammy Patterson as Tammy Temper
 Kim Patterson as Kim Temper
 Kathleen Ferguson as Barbara

Production
Scavolini was inspired to write the screenplay for the film after reading articles in Time and Newsweek concerning psychiatric patients who had been administered powerful drugs that altered their behavior. He wrote the screenplay while visiting friends in Cocoa Beach, Florida, over a period of 15 days. Scavolini recalled: "[I was] trying to tell a story and not just hit the stomach of the viewers. To hit the spectator's stomach, you need to tell a story that has its roots in reality, not in fantasy. The massacre of the father and mother by the young Tatum is not the explosion of a mental disorder but flows from the inability of him to "understand" that his parents love to have sex through sadomasochistic practices...In my film there is no hope, because the real and final message is that we are all at the mercy of our demons."

The film was also influenced by Scavolini's earlier work in hardcore pornography, which could explain the amount of extraneous nudity and the bare context behind the bloodletting that the film contains.

Filming took place in Cocoa Beach, Florida, with additional photography in New York City.

Special effects
One review published on the film's opening day opined that "the bloodshed has been rendered with loving attention to detail." Tom Savini receives a credit for providing special effects on the film, though during its release he would vehemently deny involvement. According to director Scavolini, artists Daryll Ferrucci, Ed French, Johane Hansen, and Robin Stevens were responsible for prosthetic effects, crafting the dummies used as corpses in the film; they receive credit as "special effects makeup artist" and "special effects makeup assistant." This work was completed in New York City, according to Scavolini. On set, however, Scavolini claims that Savini was present and oversaw the directing of all master special effects sequences, including the beheading scene of George's mother and father. Scavolini stated it was "incontrovertible" that Savini contributed to the film, and added: "I never understood why [he] has denied having worked on the set," though he suggested it may have been a result of a salary disagreement between Savini and Goldmine Productions. Actor Baird Stafford confirmed Savini's presence on the set in a 2014 interview. Photographs of Savini on the film set also corroborate his presence there.

Cleve Hall, a then-inexperienced local artist, managed the crew of the film's special effects at the Florida locations. Hall's recollection of Savini's connection to the picture was that the filmmakers had initially wanted Savini to oversee all of the special effects; Savini, however, recommended his friend Ed French for the project, but French opted not to sign on.

Release
Prior to receiving distribution through 21st Century Film Corporation, Warner Bros. and Universal Pictures screened the film, expressing potential interest, but only agreed to purchase it for distribution contingent on the film's gore sequences being significantly truncated. Scavolini refused, as he felt "the strongest scenes had to remain uncut because the film should be a scandalous event." 21st Century Film Corporation purchased the film for distribution, though it was released with an X rating in 117 New York theaters on October 23, 1981.

Censorship
In the United Kingdom, Nightmare was labeled a "video nasty" and prosecuted for violation of the Obscene Publications Act 1959; of the 72 films named "video nasties," it was the only title to receive prosecution and have its distributor spend time incarcerated. This government action led to a black market for the film where the cost reached .

Critical response 
Janet Maslin of The New York Times gave the film an unfavorable review, noting: "Though everything else about Nightmare is amateurish, and though its surprises are dependably unsurprising, the bloodshed has been rendered with a loving attention to detail. Garotting, slicing, puncturing and chopping are filmed at close range and accompanied by gurgling sounds. Mr. Scavolini, who does nothing here to advance this currently fashionable art form, also favors the trick whereby an ostensible scare turns out to be a practical joke." TV Guide was critical of the film, noting: "Given its earnest claims to Freudian psychological complexity, this pretentious gorefest (recipient of a self-imposed X rating) would be laughable if it weren't so repulsive."

Legacy
A clip from Nightmare was featured prominently in the 2021 British psychological horror film Censor.

References

Sources

External links 

 
 
 

1981 films
1981 horror films
1980s slasher films
American exploitation films
American serial killer films
American slasher films
American splatter films
Films about nightmares
Films set in New York City
Films set in South Carolina
Films set in Florida
Obscenity controversies in film
Video nasties
21st Century Film Corporation films
1980s English-language films
1980s American films